Annie Cardin (born September 30, 1938) is a French artist. Born in Paris, her work is included in the collections of the Smithsonian American Art Museum, the Asheville Art Museum and the Art Institute of Chicago.

References

1938 births
Living people
20th-century French women artists
21st-century French women artists
Artists from Paris